Eventi is a hotel and residential skyscraper located on Sixth Avenue and West 30th Street in Manhattan, near Herald Square.

See also
List of tallest buildings in New York City

References

External links
 http://www.eventihotel.com/

Chelsea, Manhattan
Skyscraper hotels in Manhattan
Hotels in Manhattan
Hotel buildings completed in 2010
Residential buildings completed in 2010
Sixth Avenue